The Third Arm Weapon Interface System, or Third Arm, is a passive, stabilizing device developed by the U.S. Army Research Laboratory (ARL) in 2016 to redistributes the weight of heavy firearms to make them easier to hold and carry. It weighs  less than 1.8 kg (4 pounds), and consists of a mechanical appendage made out of carbon-fiber composite that has one end attached to a carbon fiber plate that fits inside an armor plate pocket and the other end attached to a Picatinny rail on top of the gun. It was to permit more accurate use of heavier weapons  and reduce fatigue by displacing the weight of the weapon from their arms to their torso and mitigate firing recoil. As of 2018, the Third Arm is a prototype and is still in the testing phase of its development.

History 
The development of the Third Arm began in 2015 as a collaborative effort in ARL’s Human Research and Engineering Directorate (HRED) and Weapons & Research Materials Directorate (WMRD). The project was an attempt to improve the marksmanship of soldiers by finding ways that would make the use of heavier, more lethal firearms and larger bullets easier to manage.

A pilot study was conducted in summer 2017, where the prototype was tested with six soldiers who wore electromyography sensors that recorded muscle activity with and without the Third Arm. The results  indicated that the device improved shooting accuracy and lessened muscle fatigue. A second prototype was constructed based on the soldiers’ feedback. Changes included the mounting location, the additional of an extendable hinge plate that adhered to different body types, and refinements to the design that made it easier for the wearer to dive into the prone shooting position.

Applications 
The Third Arm can be used to completely take off the weight of heavy firearms such as the 7.5 kg (17-pound) M249 light machine gun or  the 12.5 kg (27.6-pound) M240B machine gun from the holder’s arms. By supporting the weapon’s weight, soldiers are capable of operating the firearm with one hand and leave the other hand free to do a different task. In addition, it can be used to carry a breaching saw or a shield instead of a firearm. Testing has shown that the Third Arm provides immediate stabilization during movement, allowing for improved marksmanship.

References 

Military technology
Firearm components
Robotic manipulation